According to the Quran, Zaqqoum or Zaqqum is a tree that "springs out of the bottom of Hell".  It is mentioned in verses  17:60 (as the "cursed tree"),  37:62-68,  44:43, and 56:52, of the Quran.

Religious references
The Qur'an says:

[44.43] Surely the tree of Zaqqum, 
[44.44] Is the food of the sinful
[44.45] Like dregs of oil; it shall boil in (their) bellies,
[44.46] Like the boiling of hot water.

The fruits of Zaqqum are shaped like heads of devils (Qur'an 37:62-68). Some Islamic scholars believe in a literal meaning of this tree grown in fire, showing the inverted flora of hell. The inhabitants of hell are forced to eat the tree's fruits, which tears their bodies apart and releases bodily fluids as a punishment. According to Umar Sulayman Al-Ashqar, a leading Salafi scholar and professor at the University of Jordan, once the palate of the sinners is satiated, the fruit in their bellies churns like burning oil. Other scholars suggest the tree is grown by the seeds of the evil deeds of the sinners, therefore the devilish fruits are the fruits of their bad actions during lifetime; as Ibn Arabi stated, the tree stands for the arrogant self.

Botany
The name zaqqum has been applied to the species Euphorbia abyssinica by the Beja people in eastern Sudan.  In Jordan, it is applied to the species Balanites aegyptiaca. In Turkey, zakkum is the vernacular for Nerium oleander; and zıkkım, a Turkish cognate, means "poison".

References

Trees in mythology
Trees in Islam
Jahannam